Tortrix is a genus of moths belonging to the family Tortricidae.

Species
Tortrix sinapina (Butler, 1879)
Tortrix viridana Linnaeus, 1758

Species formally assigned to Tortrix
Tortrix? destructus (now Paleolepidopterites destructus)
Tortrix? florissantana (now Paleolepidopterites florissantana)

See also
List of Tortricidae genera

References

External links
tortricidae.com

Tortricini
Tortricidae genera